Persatuan Sepakbola Kwarta Deli Serdang is an Indonesian football club based in Medan, North Sumatra. They play in Liga 3. Their home ground is Pardedetex Stadium.

Honours
Liga Indonesia First Division
 Champions (1): 2013

References

External links
 

Football clubs in Indonesia
Football clubs in North Sumatra
Association football clubs established in 2001
2001 establishments in Indonesia